An election to the Neath Rural District Council in West Glamorgan, Wales was held on 11 May 1967. It was preceded by the 1964 election, and followed by the 1970 election.

Overview of the results
During the previous year, the Labour Party had suffered many setbacks in south Wales, including the loss of a parliamentary seat to Plaid Cymru. At the 1967 local elections, the party lost ground in much of south Wales but the Neath Rural District was an exception and there was little change..

Candidates
Once again, the profile of candidates was similar to three years previously with a number of long-serving Labour councillors returned unopposed.

Outcome
There were a few changes but Labour retained a comfortable majority.

Ward results

Baglan Higher (one seat)

Blaengwrach (two seats)

Blaenrhonddan, Bryncoch Ward (one seat)

Blaenrhonddan, Cadoxton Ward (one seat)

Blaenrhonddan, Cilfrew Ward (one seat)

Clyne (one seats)

Coedffranc, South Ward (one seat)

Coedffranc, East Central (one seat)

Coedffranc North Ward (one seat)

Coedffranc West Ward (one seat)

Coedffranc West Central (one seat)

Dyffryn Clydach (two seats)

Dulais Higher, Crynant Ward (one seat)

Dulais Higher, Onllwyn Ward (one seat)

Dulais Higher, Seven Sisters Ward (two seats)

Dulais Lower (one seat)

Michaelstone Higher (one seat)

Neath Higher (three seats)

Neath Lower (one seat)

Resolven, Resolven Ward (two seats)

Resolven, Rhigos Ward (two seats)

Resolven, Tonna Ward (two seats)

References

1967 Welsh local elections